The 1982–83 Philadelphia Flyers season was the Flyers' 16th season in the National Hockey League (NHL). The Flyers lost in the Patrick Division Semifinals to the New York Rangers in three games.

Off-season
Mark Howe, son of hockey legend Gordie Howe and a star defenseman in his own right, was acquired via a trade with the Hartford Whalers prior to the season.

Regular season
Howe immediately became the team's best defenseman garnering 67 points and a +47 in 76 games. Midway through the season, Bob McCammon replaced Barber as captain with Bobby Clarke. Clarke led the team in points and Brian Propp and Sittler scored 40 goals each as the Flyers won a Patrick Division title with 106 points.

Season standings

Playoffs
For the second consecutive year, the Flyers were eliminated by the Rangers in the first round, this time in a three-game sweep. They allowed a total of 18 goals in the three games.

Schedule and results

Regular season

|- style="background:#cfc;"
| 1 || October 7 || Quebec Nordiques || 9–5 || 1–0–0 || 2 || 
|- style="background:#cfc;"
| 2 || October 9 || @ Washington Capitals || 3–2 || 2–0–0 || 4 || 
|- style="background:#cfc;"
| 3 || October 10 || Washington Capitals || 6–4 || 3–0–0 || 6 || 
|- style="background:#fcf;"
| 4 || October 13 || @ New York Rangers || 2–5 || 3–1–0 || 6 || 
|- style="background:#cfc;"
| 5 || October 14 || Buffalo Sabres || 4–2 || 4–1–0 || 8 || 
|- style="background:#cfc;"
| 6 || October 16 || @ Quebec Nordiques || 4–3 || 5–1–0 || 10 || 
|- style="background:#fcf;"
| 7 || October 18 || @ New Jersey Devils || 1–3 || 5–2–0 || 10 || 
|- style="background:#fcf;"
| 8 || October 21 || Montreal Canadiens || 1–2 || 5–3–0 || 10 || 
|- style="background:#fcf;"
| 9 || October 23 || @ Pittsburgh Penguins || 2–4 || 5–4–0 || 10 || 
|- style="background:#cfc;"
| 10 || October 24 || Detroit Red Wings || 7–4 || 6–4–0 || 12 || 
|- style="background:#cfc;"
| 11 || October 28 || Pittsburgh Penguins || 9–2 || 7–4–0 || 14 || 
|- style="background:#fcf;"
| 12 || October 30 || @ Minnesota North Stars || 2–3 || 7–5–0 || 14 || 
|- style="background:#cfc;"
| 13 || October 31 || @ Winnipeg Jets || 3–2 || 8–5–0 || 16 || 
|-

|- style="background:#fcf;"
| 14 || November 4 || Vancouver Canucks || 3–4 || 8–6–0 || 16 || 
|- style="background:#cfc;"
| 15 || November 6 || @ New York Islanders || 6–3 || 9–6–0 || 18 || 
|- style="background:#ffc;"
| 16 || November 7 || New York Islanders || 2–2 || 9–6–1 || 19 || 
|- style="background:#fcf;"
| 17 || November 10 || @ Buffalo Sabres || 2–7 || 9–7–1 || 19 || 
|- style="background:#cfc;"
| 18 || November 11 || New York Rangers || 7–3 || 10–7–1 || 21 || 
|- style="background:#fcf;"
| 19 || November 13 || Edmonton Oilers || 3–4 || 10–8–1 || 21 || 
|- style="background:#cfc;"
| 20 || November 18 || Calgary Flames || 3–2 || 11–8–1 || 23 || 
|- style="background:#fcf;"
| 21 || November 20 || @ Montreal Canadiens || 4–6 || 11–9–1 || 23 || 
|- style="background:#cfc;"
| 22 || November 21 || St. Louis Blues || 3–1 || 12–9–1 || 25 || 
|- style="background:#ffc;"
| 23 || November 24 || Boston Bruins || 4–4 || 12–9–2 || 26 || 
|- style="background:#cfc;"
| 24 || November 27 || @ Los Angeles Kings || 4–0 || 13–9–2 || 28 || 
|- style="background:#ffc;"
| 25 || November 28 || @ Vancouver Canucks || 5–5 || 13–9–3 || 29 || 
|-

|- style="background:#cfc;"
| 26 || December 1 || @ Edmonton Oilers || 4–2 || 14–9–3 || 31 || 
|- style="background:#ffc;"
| 27 || December 4 || @ Pittsburgh Penguins || 0–0 || 14–9–4 || 32 || 
|- style="background:#fcf;"
| 28 || December 5 || @ Boston Bruins || 4–6 || 14–10–4 || 32 || 
|- style="background:#cfc;"
| 29 || December 9 || Quebec Nordiques || 4–1 || 15–10–4 || 34 || 
|- style="background:#fcf;"
| 30 || December 11 || @ Hartford Whalers || 4–7 || 15–11–4 || 34 || 
|- style="background:#cfc;"
| 31 || December 12 || Pittsburgh Penguins || 4–3 || 16–11–4 || 36 || 
|- style="background:#cfc;"
| 32 || December 16 || Detroit Red Wings || 7–2 || 17–11–4 || 38 || 
|- style="background:#ffc;"
| 33 || December 18 || @ New York Islanders || 4–4 || 17–11–5 || 39 || 
|- style="background:#fcf;"
| 34 || December 19 || Washington Capitals || 1–3 || 17–12–5 || 39 || 
|- style="background:#cfc;"
| 35 || December 22 || @ New Jersey Devils || 3–1 || 18–12–5 || 41 || 
|- style="background:#cfc;"
| 36 || December 26 || @ Washington Capitals || 6–3 || 19–12–5 || 43 || 
|- style="background:#cfc;"
| 37 || December 27 || @ Detroit Red Wings || 8–4 || 20–12–5 || 45 || 
|- style="background:#cfc;"
| 38 || December 30 || @ Calgary Flames || 6–3 || 21–12–5 || 47 || 
|-

|- style="background:#cfc;"
| 39 || January 1 || @ St. Louis Blues || 4–1 || 22–12–5 || 49 || 
|- style="background:#cfc;"
| 40 || January 2 || @ Chicago Black Hawks || 3–1 || 23–12–5 || 51 || 
|- style="background:#cfc;"
| 41 || January 4 || Vancouver Canucks || 4–1 || 24–12–5 || 53 || 
|- style="background:#cfc;"
| 42 || January 8 || @ Hartford Whalers || 7–4 || 25–12–5 || 55 || 
|- style="background:#cfc;"
| 43 || January 9 || Hartford Whalers || 8–4 || 26–12–5 || 57 || 
|- style="background:#cfc;"
| 44 || January 13 || Pittsburgh Penguins || 8–1 || 27–12–5 || 59 || 
|- style="background:#ffc;"
| 45 || January 15 || Chicago Black Hawks || 4–4 || 27–12–6 || 60 || 
|- style="background:#cfc;"
| 46 || January 16 || @ New York Rangers || 4–0 || 28–12–6 || 62 || 
|- style="background:#fcf;"
| 47 || January 18 || @ Washington Capitals || 1–4 || 28–13–6 || 62 || 
|- style="background:#cfc;"
| 48 || January 20 || Calgary Flames || 5–2 || 29–13–6 || 64 || 
|- style="background:#cfc;"
| 49 || January 22 || @ New York Islanders || 1–0 || 30–13–6 || 66 || 
|- style="background:#cfc;"
| 50 || January 23 || New York Rangers || 3–1 || 31–13–6 || 68 || 
|- style="background:#cfc;"
| 51 || January 25 || New Jersey Devils || 5–1 || 32–13–6 || 70 || 
|- style="background:#cfc;"
| 52 || January 27 || Winnipeg Jets || 5–2 || 33–13–6 || 72 || 
|- style="background:#ffc;"
| 53 || January 29 || @ Minnesota North Stars || 2–2 || 33–13–7 || 73 || 
|-

|- style="background:#cfc;"
| 54 || February 2 || @ Winnipeg Jets || 6–3 || 34–13–7 || 75 || 
|- style="background:#cfc;"
| 55 || February 5 || @ Los Angeles Kings || 2–0 || 35–13–7 || 77 || 
|- style="background:#cfc;"
| 56 || February 10 || St. Louis Blues || 5–2 || 36–13–7 || 79 || 
|- style="background:#fcf;"
| 57 || February 13 || Los Angeles Kings || 4–5 || 36–14–7 || 79 || 
|- style="background:#cfc;"
| 58 || February 17 || Edmonton Oilers || 7–3 || 37–14–7 || 81 || 
|- style="background:#cfc;"
| 59 || February 19 || New York Rangers || 8–5 || 38–14–7 || 83 || 
|- style="background:#cfc;"
| 60 || February 20 || New Jersey Devils || 3–0 || 39–14–7 || 85 || 
|- style="background:#fcf;"
| 61 || February 23 || @ Buffalo Sabres || 2–4 || 39–15–7 || 85 || 
|- style="background:#cfc;"
| 62 || February 24 || Pittsburgh Penguins || 6–3 || 40–15–7 || 87 || 
|- style="background:#cfc;"
| 63 || February 27 || New York Islanders || 2–0 || 41–15–7 || 89 || 
|-

|- style="background:#ffc;"
| 64 || March 2 || @ Toronto Maple Leafs || 2–2 || 41–15–8 || 90 || 
|- style="background:#cfc;"
| 65 || March 3 || @ New Jersey Devils || 4–1 || 42–15–8 || 92 || 
|- style="background:#fcf;"
| 66 || March 5 || @ Washington Capitals || 3–4 || 42–16–8 || 92 || 
|- style="background:#cfc;"
| 67 || March 6 || @ Pittsburgh Penguins || 5–3 || 43–16–8 || 94 || 
|- style="background:#fcf;"
| 68 || March 8 || Chicago Black Hawks || 1–4 || 43–17–8 || 94 || 
|- style="background:#cfc;"
| 69 || March 10 || Minnesota North Stars || 6–3 || 44–17–8 || 96 || 
|- style="background:#fcf;"
| 70 || March 12 || @ Boston Bruins || 2–5 || 44–18–8 || 96 || 
|- style="background:#fcf;"
| 71 || March 14 || @ New York Rangers || 2–8 || 44–19–8 || 96 || 
|- style="background:#cfc;"
| 72 || March 17 || Montreal Canadiens || 6–4 || 45–19–8 || 98 || 
|- style="background:#fcf;"
| 73 || March 19 || @ New York Islanders || 2–9 || 45–20–8 || 98 || 
|- style="background:#fcf;"
| 74 || March 20 || Washington Capitals || 2–3 || 45–21–8 || 98 || 
|- style="background:#cfc;"
| 75 || March 24 || Toronto Maple Leafs || 7–4 || 46–21–8 || 100 || 
|- style="background:#fcf;"
| 76 || March 25 || @ New Jersey Devils || 5–6 || 46–22–8 || 100 || 
|- style="background:#cfc;"
| 77 || March 27 || New Jersey Devils || 4–1 || 47–22–8 || 102 || 
|- style="background:#fcf;"
| 78 || March 31 || New York Rangers || 2–4 || 47–23–8 || 102 || 
|-

|- style="background:#cfc;"
| 79 || April 2 || @ Toronto Maple Leafs || 6–3 || 48–23–8 || 104 || 
|- style="background:#cfc;"
| 80 || April 3 || New York Islanders || 4–2 || 49–23–8 || 106 || 
|-

|-
| Legend:

Playoffs

|- style="background:#fcf;"
| 1 || April 5 || New York Rangers || 3–5 || Rangers lead 1–0 || 
|- style="background:#fcf;"
| 2 || April 7 || New York Rangers || 3–4 || Rangers lead 2–0 || 
|- style="background:#fcf;"
| 3 || April 9 || @ New York Rangers || 3–9 || Rangers win 3–0 || 
|-

|-
| Legend:

Player statistics

Scoring
 Position abbreviations: C = Center; D = Defense; G = Goaltender; LW = Left Wing; RW = Right Wing
  = Joined team via a transaction (e.g., trade, waivers, signing) during the season. Stats reflect time with the Flyers only.
  = Left team via a transaction (e.g., trade, waivers, release) during the season. Stats reflect time with the Flyers only.

Goaltending
  = Joined team via a transaction (e.g., trade, waivers, signing) during the season. Stats reflect time with the Flyers only.
  = Left team via a transaction (e.g., trade, waivers, release) during the season. Stats reflect time with the Flyers only.

Awards and records

Awards

Records

Among the team records set during the 1982–83 season was the 35 seconds it took to score the fastest three goals during the season opener on October 7, which is tied for the team record. Later that month on October 28, the 31 seconds it took to score the fastest two goals from the start of a period is also tied for the team record. Goaltender Pelle Lindbergh set three consecutive wins records. From December 22 to February 10, Lindbergh won nine consecutive games, which is tied for the team record among all goalies and the record for rookie goaltenders. His eight consecutive road wins from December 22 to March 3 is also the team record. The team's eight consecutive road wins from December 22 to January 16 is the longest in team history. Brian Propp’s twelve game-winning goals on the season is tied for the team record.

Milestones

Transactions
The Flyers were involved in the following transactions from May 17, 1982, the day after the deciding game of the 1982 Stanley Cup Finals, through May 17, 1983, the day of the deciding game of the 1983 Stanley Cup Finals.

Trades

Players acquired

Players lost

Signings

Draft picks

Philadelphia's picks at the 1982 NHL Entry Draft, which was held at the Montreal Forum in Montreal, Quebec, on June 9, 1982.

Farm teams
The Flyers were affiliated with the Maine Mariners of the AHL and the Toledo Goaldiggers of the IHL.

Notes

References
General
 
 
 
Specific

Philadelphia Flyers seasons
Philadelphia
Philadelphia
Patrick Division champion seasons
Philadelphia
Philadelphia